5th Visual Effects Society Awards
February 12, 2007

Best Visual Effects – Motion Picture:
Pirates of the Caribbean: Dead Man's Chest

The 5th Visual Effects Society Awards, given in Los Angeles on February 11, 2007, at the Kodak Grand Ballroom,  honored the best visual effects in film and television of 2006. An edited version of the awards were broadcast on HDNet.

Winners and nominees
(winners in bold)

Honorary Awards
Lifetime Achievement Award:
Dennis Muren

Film

Television

Other categories

References

External links
 Visual Effects Society

2006
Visual Effects Society Awards
Visual Effects Society Awards
Visual Effects Society Awards
Visual Effects Society Awards